Salamabad Union is an Union Parishad under Kalia Upazila of Narail District in the division of Khulna, Bangladesh. It has an area of 59.23 km2 (22.87 sq mi) and a population of 12,468.

References

Unions of Kalia Upazila
Unions of Narail District
Unions of Khulna Division